Mark Roah (born December 28, 1968) is an American entrepreneur and technology inventor based in Palos Verdes Estates, California. He is the co-founder of Octane360, an internet marketing firm based in California which was acquired by Local.com in 2010.  The US Patent and Trademark Office issued patent for technology that Roah invented at Octane360. Currently, he is a partner and co-founder of Avenue I Media, a digital marketing company based in Redondo Beach, California.

Early life
Roah was born in La Palma, California, in 1968. He completed his school education at John F. Kennedy High School, La Palma in 1987. He attended San Francisco State University where he received his BS degree in finance, in 1992.

Career
Roah started his professional career in 1996 by founding L90, Inc, an online advertising sales network with over $50 million revenue and 250 employees around the world. L90 Inc. was a successful IPO on the Nasdaq Stock Market in 2000. In 2002, Roah co-founded and began working as Vice President of Business Development with Verapass Marketing. Prior to its acquisition by ValueClick, Verapass Marketing was an independent internet marketing company based in El Segundo, California.

Roah has also worked as a consultant with Oversee.net and Revenue.net, and held the title of Senior Vice President of Business Development at Simply Static, LLC. In 2010, Roah co-founded Octane360, an internet marketing company based in Los Angeles, California. He invented a technology for bulk web domain generation and management with Adam Rioux at Octane360, USPTO issued patent for this technology in 2010. Local.com Corporation acquired Octane360 in a $11 million deal in July 2010.

In 2013, Roah co-founded Avenue I Media, a digital marketing firm based in Redondo Beach, California, with Adam Rioux.

References

External links
Avenue I Media's Website

1968 births
Living people
American patent holders
21st-century American businesspeople
20th-century American businesspeople
People from La Palma, California
People from Palos Verdes Estates, California
21st-century American inventors